Viktor Rönnbäck (born July 10, 1992) is a Swedish professional ice hockey player. He played with Luleå HF in the Elitserien during the 2010–11 Elitserien season.

References

External links

1992 births
Luleå HF players
Living people
Swedish ice hockey defencemen
People from Luleå
Sportspeople from Norrbotten County